Naydenov, Naidenov or Naydyonov (Russian: Найдёнов; Bulgarian: Найденов) is a Slavic masculine surname, its feminine counterpart is Naydenova, Naidenova or Naydyonova. It may refer to
Aleksandrina Naydenova (born 1992), Bulgarian tennis player
Arsen Naydyonov (1941–2010), Russian football coach
Georgi Naydenov (businessman) (1927–1998), Bulgarian businessman and banker
Georgi Naydenov (footballer, born 1931) (1931–1970), Bulgarian football goalkeeper and manager
Ivan Naydenov (born 1981), Bulgarian football player 
Ivaylo Naydenov (born 1998), Bulgarian football player
Luis Petcoff Naidenoff (born 1967), Argentine politician of Bulgarian descent
Lyudmil Naidenov (born 1970), Bulgarian volleyball player
Marius Naydenov (born 1994), Bulgarian football player 
Miroslav Naydenov, Bulgarian politician
Nayden Naydenov (born 1967), Bulgarian volleyball player
Nikolay Naydenov (born 1974), Bulgarian volleyball player
Nikita Naidenov (1892–1961), Russian speed skater and aviator
Olga Naidenova (born 1987), Russian figure skater
Sergey Naydyonov (1868–1922), Russian playwright
Stefan Naydenov (1957–2010), Bulgarian football player
Tihomir Naydenov (born 1986), Bulgarian football midfielder 
Tsvetelina Naydenova (born 1994), Bulgarian rhythmic gymnast 
Valentin Naydenov (born 1972), Bulgarian football player
Vasil Naydenov, Bulgarian singer-songwriter
Vira Naydyonova (1948–2016), Ukrainian industrialist 

Russian-language surnames
Bulgarian-language surnames